Littleford is a surname. Notable people with the surname include:

Arthur Littleford (1868–1934), English footballer 
Beth Littleford (born 1968), American actress, comedian, and television personality
Hal Littleford (1924–2016), American football player and coach and politician